The Renault Celtaquatre is a small family car produced by the French manufacturer Renault between 1934 and 1938. Although French, it took some of its styling cues from American cars of the time. Its rounded silhouette gave it the nickname “Celtaboule” ("Celtaball").

Details and evolution 
The Celtaquatre was presented to the public in April 1934 and entered production a month later.  Its arrival coincided with that of Citroën's Traction Avant, and the Renault's launch was overshadowed by Citroën's powerful publicity machine.

The car was powered by a four-cylinder 1463 cc side-valve engine, for which a maximum of 34 hp @ 3,500 rpm was claimed. Power passed to the rear wheels via a classic three speed transmission. The suspension was based on rigid axles front and back, which was seen as a rather minimalist at a time when competitor vehicles from volume automakers such as the Peugeot 301 were being delivered with independent front suspension. However, the 8CV Celtaquatre was also much more aggressively priced than the 8CV 301:  At the Paris Motor Show in October the list price for a Celtaquatre with a standard "berline" (saloon) body was given as ₣16,900 francs, while the Peugeot 301 "berline normale" was priced at ₣20,500 francs.

In 1935, adjustments were made to the bonnet, with horizontal chrome-lined openings in place of the earlier three shutters. Two-tone paintwork was standard. A supplement of ₣400 francs was required for a single colour.

In 1936, the Celtaquatre lost its roundness to acquire a more aerodynamic shape. Appearance of two new body types: a Cabriolet and a Coupé Cabriolet. In 1937, the Celtaquatre received an American-inspired V-shaped grill which was retained throughout the rest of the model's production.

In 1938, a new bumper design appeared with straight slats. The coupé was discontinued.

In 1939, after production of 44,000 units, the Celtaquatre was replaced by the Juvaquatre.

By 1940, most of the Celtaquatre cars remaining in stock were delivered to the French Army.

In July 1941, the last 13 Celtaquatre cars were transformed into a small series of Novaquatre.

Characteristics 
 Consumption: 8 liters per 100 km
 Speed: 
 Power: 30 hp (8 CV)
 Brakes: cable-actuated drums front and rear
 Battery: 6 V

Types 
 ZR1
 ZR2
 AEC1 (led commercial)
 ADC1
 ADC2
 ADC3
 BCR

References

Notes

Celtaquatre
Cars introduced in 1934
1930s cars
Rear-wheel-drive vehicles
Compact cars
Sedans
Convertibles
Coupés